This is a list of television broadcasters which provide coverage of the Ekstraklasa, Polish football's top-level competition.

Until 2020–21 season

Poland

Outside Poland

References 

Association football on television